A sacramental in Christianity is a material object or action (in Latin sacramentalia) ritually blessed by a priest to signal its association with the sacraments and so to incite reverence during acts of worship. They are recognised by the Catholic Church, the Eastern Orthodox Church, the Oriental Orthodox Churches, the Church of the East, the Lutheran churches, the Old Catholic Church, the Anglican churches, Independent Catholic churches, and Methodist churches. 

In the Bible, prayer cloths and holy oil are mentioned in reference to praying for healing. Holy water is a sacramental that believers use to recall their baptism; other common sacramentals include blessed candles (often given to churchgoers on Candlemas), blessed palms (given away at churches on Palm Sunday), blessed ashes (placed on believers' foreheads on Ash Wednesday services), a cross necklace (often taken to be blessed by a pastor before daily use), a headcovering (worn by women, especially during prayer and worship), blessed salt, and holy cards, as well as Christian art, especially a crucifix. Apart from those worn daily, such as a cross necklace or devotional scapular, sacramentals such as a Family Bible, are often kept on home altars in Christian households. When blessed in a betrothal ceremony, engagement rings become a sacramental.

As an adjective, sacramental means "of or pertaining to sacraments".

Biblical basis 
The Biblical basis for the use of sacramentals is that Jesus used a form of sacramentals himself; for example, when Christ healed a blind man, he made a mud paste that he put over the eyes of the man, before telling him to wash in the Pool of Siloam.

Denominational usage

Anglican 

A text of the Episcopal Church in the United States of America includes items such as the Anglican rosary, ashes, and palms among objects counted as sacramentals.

Catholic 
The Catholic Church currently defines sacramentals as "sacred signs which... signify effects, particularly of a spiritual nature, which are obtained through the intercession of the Church. By them men are disposed to receive the chief effect of the sacraments, and various occasions in life are rendered holy."

Sacramentals do not confer the grace of the Holy Spirit in the way that the sacraments do, but by the Church’s prayer, they prepare one to receive grace and dispose a person to cooperate with it. "For well-disposed members of the faithful, the liturgy of the sacraments and sacramentals sanctifies almost every event of their lives with the divine grace which flows from the Paschal mystery of the Passion, Death, and Resurrection of Christ. From this source all sacraments and sacramentals draw their power."

The Catechism of the Catholic Church lists three types of sacramentals: blessings, consecrations/dedications, and exorcisms.

Rosary beads, scapulars, medals and religious images are more accurately termed devotional articles; non-liturgical prayers such as the rosary, the stations of the cross, litanies, and novenas are called popular devotions or "expressions of popular piety".

The Latin Church allows the reception of certain sacramentals, such as blessings, by non-Catholics unless there is a prohibition to the contrary.

Pentecostal 

Pentecostal theologian Mark Pearson states that the Bible speaks of sacramentals, sometimes referred to as points of contact, such as blessed prayer cloths and holy oil. He states that God is the source of healing and that Pentecostal clergy "can confidently offer prayer, administer the various sacramentals, and lay hands on the sick".

Further reading

References

External links 
 Catechism of the Catholic Church: Sacramentals

 
Christian belief and doctrine